6-Acetyl-2,3,4,5-tetrahydropyridine is an aroma compound and flavor that gives baked goods such as white bread, popcorn, and tortillas their typical smell, together with its structural homolog 2-acetyl-1-pyrroline.

6-Acetyl-2,3,4,5-tetrahydropyridine and 2-acetyl-1-pyrroline are usually formed by Maillard reactions during heating of food. Both compounds have odor thresholds below 0.06 ng/L.

Structure and properties

6-Acetyl-2,3,4,5-tetrahydropyridine is a substituted tetrahydropyridine and a cyclic imine as well as a ketone. The compound exists in a chemical equilibrium with its tautomer 6-acetyl-1,2,3,4-tetrahydropyridine that differs only by the position of the double bond in the tetrahydropyridine ring:

References 

Flavors
Ketones
Imines